M. flexuosa may refer to:

Macrozamia flexuosa, a species of plant in the family Zamiaceae
Mauritia flexuosa, a species of palm tree

See also
Flexuosa (disambiguation)